Ambient is the second studio album by American electronica musician Moby, released in August 1993 by record label Instinct.

Composition 

The album is composed of electronic ambient pieces, similar to Aphex Twin's Selected Ambient Works releases. Like the Aphex Twin releases, the work is mainly instrumental (although there are samples of the sound of a choir vocalizing on "Tongues", and a woman saying "bad days" in the background of "Bad Days"). Many of the tracks are beat-driven, except "J Breas" and "Piano and String", which both use pianos and synthesizers. "Bad Days" uses a 'sweeping' synth effect, and "Sound" is a high-pitched loop playing and fading out and in. "80" uses synths mimicking an acoustic guitar.

The album has an experimental, moody style. Many of the tracks (including "Bad Days" and "Lean on Me") are dark and unearthly. There are also some more uplifting numbers, like "Heaven", "Tongues" and "Dog", which are more beat driven, danceable numbers. The track "Myopia" uses a bubbling synth-bass style. "House of Blue Leaves" and "My Beautiful Blue Sky" are more experimental beat songs ("House of Blue Leaves" is a simple beat and some keyboards, and "My Beautiful Blue Sky" is a tribal rhythm, synths, and a piano).

Track listing

Personnel 
Credits for Ambient adapted from album liner notes.

 Moby – production, writing
 Bob Ward – digital editing

Artwork and design
 Jill Greenberg – photography
 Wendi Horowitz – design

References

External links 
 
 

Moby albums
1993 albums
Ambient techno albums
Albums produced by Moby
Instinct Records albums